Fitim Azemi (born 25 June 1992) is a Norwegian footballer who currently plays for.

Azemi scored 31 goals for Follo in the 2014 2. divisjon. He made his senior debut for Bodø/Glimt in the first league round of the 2015 Tippeligaen.

Career statistics

Club

References

External links
 Fitim Azemi at altomfotball.no 

1992 births
Living people
Footballers from Oslo
Norwegian footballers
Association football forwards
Follo FK players
FK Bodø/Glimt players
Maccabi Haifa F.C. players
Vålerenga Fotball players
Sandefjord Fotball players
Tromsø IL players
Stabæk Fotball players
Norwegian First Division players
Eliteserien players
Israeli Premier League players
Norwegian Second Division players
Norwegian Third Division players
Expatriate footballers in Israel
Norwegian expatriate sportspeople in Israel
Norwegian expatriate footballers
Norwegian people of Kosovan descent